Stephen Garton AM, FAHA, FRAHS, FASSA FRSN (born 1955) is an Australian historian and Professor of History at the University of Sydney.

Books 
Medicine and Madness: Insanity in NSW 1880-1940 (1988)
Out of Luck: Poor Australians 1788-1988 (1990)
The Cost of War: Australians Return (1996)
Histories of Sexuality: Antiquity to Sexual Revolution (2004)
 Playing the Numbers: Gambling in Harlem between the Wars (with Shane white, Stephen Robertson and Graham White, 2010)
 Preserving the Past: The University of Sydney and the Unified National System of Higher Education 1987-96 (with Julia Horne, 2017)

References

Living people
1955 births
Fellows of the Australian Academy of the Humanities
Academic staff of the University of Sydney
Australian historians
Historians of sexuality
Members of the Order of Australia
Fellows of the Academy of the Social Sciences in Australia